The 1960 French Grand Prix was a Formula One motor race held at Reims-Gueux on 3 July 1960. It was race 6 of 10 in the 1960 World Championship of Drivers and race 5 of 9 in the 1960 International Cup for Formula One Manufacturers.

The 50-lap race was won from pole position by Australian driver Jack Brabham, driving a works Cooper-Climax. Belgian driver Olivier Gendebien finished second in a Cooper-Climax entered by the British Racing Partnership, while New Zealander Bruce McLaren was third in the other works Cooper-Climax.

Classification

Qualifying

Race

Championship standings after the race

Drivers' Championship standings

Constructors' Championship standings

References

French Grand Prix
French Grand Prix
1960 in French motorsport